The Chief of Staff of the People's Liberation Army Navy is the third highest-ranking officer in the People's Liberation Army Navy (PLAN). The Chief of Staff is the head of the Naval Forces Military Command authorities and responsible to assist the military officer in the navy command.

List of chiefs of staff

References

Further reading